Seymour High School may refer to:

Seymour High School (Connecticut) in Seymour, Connecticut
Seymour High School (Illinois) in Payson, Illinois 
Seymour High School (Indiana) in Seymour, Indiana 
Seymour High School (Iowa) in Seymour, Iowa 
Seymour High School (Missouri) in Seymour, Missouri 
Seymour High School (Tennessee) in Seymour, Tennessee
Seymour High School (Texas) in Seymour, Texas

Schools with similar names include:
Mahomet-Seymour High School in Mahomet, Illinois 
Seymour Community High School in Seymour, Wisconsin 
Seymour Technical High School in Seymour, Victoria, Australia